Vidya Niketan Birla Public School Pilani is a boarding school in India.
Shishu Mandir, which was later rechristened as Vidya Niketan (popularly known as Birla Public School) was founded by the Birla Educational Trust in 1944 under the guidance of Dr. Maria Montessori.  Her understanding of the specific needs of the growing children and her sense of aestheticism. The institution remained a day school until 1948. In 1952, the school was made a residential institution. In 1953, the school was granted the membership of the Indian Public School Conference.

External links 

Private schools in Rajasthan
Boarding schools in Rajasthan
Boarding schools in India
Education in Jhunjhunu district
Educational institutions established in 1944
1944 establishments in India
Montessori schools in India